Metropolis is a 1925 science fiction novel by the German writer Thea von Harbou. The novel was the basis for and written in tandem with Fritz Lang's 1927 film Metropolis.

Premise
The story is set in a technologically-advanced city, which is sustained by the existence of an exploited class of labourers who live underground, far away from the gleaming surface world. Freder, the son of Joh Fredersen, one of the city's founders, falls in love with Maria, a girl from the underground. The two classes begin to clash for lack of a unifying force.

Publication
The novel was serialised in the magazine Illustriertes Blatt in 1925, accompanied by screenshots from the upcoming film adaptation. It was published in book form in 1926 by August Scherl. An English translation was published in 1927.

Reception
Michael Joseph of The Bookman wrote about the novel: "It is a remarkable piece of work, skilfully reproducing the atmosphere one has come to associate with the most ambitious German film productions. Suggestive in many respects of the dramatic work of Karel Capek and of the earlier fantastic romances of H. G. Wells, in treatment it is an interesting example of expressionist literature. [...] Metropolis is one of the most powerful novels I have read and one which may capture a large public both in America and England if it does not prove too bewildering to the plain reader."

Film adaptation
The book was written with the intention of being adapted for film by Harbou's husband, the director Fritz Lang. Harbou collaborated with Lang on the script for the film, also titled Metropolis. Shooting began before the novel was published. The film omits certain parts of the book, especially references to the occult (of which a small hint exists in the film), as well as the moral motivations given for certain actions of the main characters.

See also
 Maschinenmensch
 Rotwang
 1925 in science fiction
 1926 in science fiction

References

1925 German-language novels
1925 science fiction novels
Dystopian novels
German novels adapted into films
German science fiction novels
Metropolis (1927 film)
Novels by Thea von Harbou
Novels first published in serial form
Novels set in the 2020s
Books about cities
1925 German novels